Órfãos da Terra (English: Orphans of a Nation) is a Brazilian telenovela produced and broadcast by TV Globo. It premiered on 2 April 2019, replacing Espelho da Vida, and ended on 27 September 2019, being replaced by Éramos Seis. Written by Duca Rachid and Thelma Guedes, with the collaboration of Dora Castellar, Aimar Labaki, Carolina Ziskind and Cristina Biscay; with direction of Pedro Peregrino, Bruno Safadi, Alexandre Macedo and Lúcio Tavares, general direction of André Câmara and artistic direction of Gustavo Fernandez.

It stars Julia Dalavia, Renato Góes, Alice Wegmann, Carmo Dalla Vecchia, Rodrigo Simas, Anajú Dorigon, Emanuelle Araújo and Kaysar Dadour in the main roles.

Plot 
After being victims of a bombing in Syria, Missade (Ana Cecília Costa) and Elias (Marco Ricca) flee to Lebanon with their children, Khaled, a boy who was injured, and Laila (Julia Dalavia) - who agrees to marry a powerful sheikh, Aziz Abdallah (Herson Capri) in exchange for money to pay for his brother's treatment. However, when Khaled dies, Laila escapes to Brazil with her parents. After realizing this, the sheikh sends after her Jammil (Renato Góes), a man of his trust and fiancee of his daughter, Dalila Abdallah (Alice Wegmann). Inevitably Laila and Jammil fall in love and become fugitives. Aziz also decides to go to Brazil to make sure his marriage with Laila is fulfilled. Mysteriously, Aziz is murdered, to which his daughter, Dalila, goes to Brazil with a plan to get revenge on Jammil and Laila.

Cast 
 Julia Dalavia as Laila Faiek
 Renato Góes as Jammil Zarif
 Alice Wegmann as Dalila Abdallah / Basma Bakri
 Carmo Dalla Vecchia as Paul Abbás
 Rodrigo Simas as Bruno Monte Castelli
 Anajú Dorigon as Camila Nasser
 Kaysar Dadour as Fauze
 Emanuelle Araújo as Zuleika Nasser
 Danton Mello as Antonio Carlos Almeida (Delegado Almeidinha)
 Bia Arantes as Valéria Augusta
 Guilherme Fontes as Norberto Monte Castelli
 Leona Cavalli as Teresa Monte Castelli 
 Ana Cecília Costa as Missade Faiek
 Marco Ricca as Elias Faiek
 Carol Castro as Dr. Helena Torquato
 Eliane Giardini as Rânia Anssarah Nasser
 Paulo Betti as Miguel Nasser
 Bruno Cabrerizo as Hussein Zarif
 Allan Souza Lima as Youssef Abdallah
 Veronica Debom as Sara Roth Fischer / Maria
 Marcelo Médici as Abner Blum
 Mouhamed Harfouch as Ali Al Aud
 Luana Martau as Latifa
 André Coimbra as Padre Zoran
 Simone Gutierrez as Aline Nasser Batista
 Guilhermina Libanio as Cibele Nasser
 Filipe Bragança as Benjamin Nasser Batista
 Glicério do Rosário as Caetano Batista
 Nicette Bruno as Ester Blum
 Osmar Prado as Bóris Fischer
 Betty Gofman as Eva Roth Fischer
 Flávio Migliaccio as Mamede Al Aud
 Paula Burlamaqui as Dr. Letícia Monteiro
 Eduardo Mossri as Dr. Faruq Murad
 Vitor Thiré as Davi Roth Fischer
 Blaise Musipère as Jean-Baptiste
 Eli Ferreira as Marie Patchou
 Ana Guasque as Mágida Hadi
 Lola Fanucchi as Muna Al Aud
 Leandro Firmino as Detetive Tomás
 Luciano Salles as Dr. Rogério Pessoa
 Darília Oliveira as Aida Abdallah
 Yasmin Garcez as Fairouz Abdallah
 Cristiane Amorim as Santinha
 Gabi Costa as Nazira Murad
 Rafael Sun as Arthur Nasser Batista (Arthurzinho)
 Letícia Carnaval as Yasmin Hadi / Yasmin Nasser Batista
 Sophia Roffe as Hadije
 Max Lima as Martim

Guest cast 
 Herson Capri as Sheik Aziz Abdallah
 Letícia Sabatella as Soraia Anssarah Abdallah
 Rodrigo Vidal as Khaled Faiek
 Alexandre Moreno as Delegado Evandro
 Raquel Fabbri as Estela
 Rafael Sieg as Rodrigo Torquato
 Beatrice Sayd as Samira
 Álvaro Brandão as Ahmed
 Thales Miranda as Arthurzinho (5 years old)

Soundtrack 

Órfãos da Terra (Trilha Sonora da Novela) is the soundtrack of the telenovela, released on 31 May 2019 by Som Livre.

Ratings

Awards and nominations

References

External links 
  
 

2019 telenovelas
TV Globo telenovelas
Brazilian telenovelas
2019 Brazilian television series debuts
2019 Brazilian television series endings
Brazilian LGBT-related television shows
Bisexuality-related television series
International Emmy Award for Best Telenovela
Television shows set in São Paulo
Television shows set in Syria
Television shows set in Lebanon
Portuguese-language telenovelas
Television series about immigration